Battle of Fairfax Court House may refer to:

 Battle of Fairfax Court House (June 1861)
 Battle of Fairfax Court House (June 1863)